Real World/Road Rules Challenge: The Gauntlet III is the 15th season of the MTV reality game show, The Challenge (at the time known as Real World/Road Rules Challenge).

Being the third in The Gauntlet series, The Gauntlet III marked the show's 2nd trilogy (Inferno III is the first), continuing on from The Gauntlet (7th season) and The Gauntlet 2 (11th season). The season was filmed in Riviera Nayarita, Mexico, with former cast members from The Real World and Road Rules competing, along with several cast members from the Fresh Meat challenge. This season was in the format of two teams: Veterans vs. Rookies, with a format similar to The Gauntlet 2. The contestants on the Veterans team had been on at least two prior seasons of the Challenge, and the contestants on the Rookies team had been on fewer than two prior seasons.

Contestants

Format
The competition consists of a series of team challenges (sometimes called "missions") with an elimination challenge, known as the "Gauntlet", following each of the team challenges except the final. Each team challenge puts the team of Veterans against the team of Rookies. Prior to the challenge, it is announced whether males or females will compete in the Gauntlet following the challenge.

After each team challenge, on a male Gauntlet day, the winning team selects a male member of the losing team to protect from the Gauntlet and another male member to send into the Gauntlet. The losing team then selects one of its own males to go against the person picked by the winners. On a female Gauntlet day, the players protected and sent into the Gauntlet are females.

After the two players for the Gauntlet are picked, host T. J. Lavin spins a wheel to determine which challenge will be played in the Gauntlet. The loser of the Gauntlet is eliminated from the game.

In this season, minor prizes are awarded after each challenge to the team members that were not vulnerable to elimination in the following Gauntlet; i.e. on challenges before male Gauntlets, prizes are awarded to female members of the winning team, and vice versa. The grand prize is $300,000, which is split among the remaining members of the team that wins the final challenge.

 No player can be saved from the Gauntlet on two consecutive opportunities. (For example, if the Veterans win the sixth challenge and save Johanna, lose the eighth challenge, and win the tenth challenge, then they cannot save Johanna from the tenth Gauntlet; even though they aren't two consecutive female Gauntlets, they are two consecutive opportunities.)
 No Gauntlet challenge is played twice consecutively (see "Gauntlet games" below).
 This season differs from The Gauntlet 2 in that the teams do not have captains.
 This season differs from most prior two-team Challenges in that there are no bank accounts; prize money is only given for the final challenge.

Gameplay

Challenge games
 Piñata Pit: After T. J. Lavin strikes a Mexican piñata hanging over a mud pit, orange and green colored balls drop into the pit, and players from each team have to retrieve their designated colored balls—orange for the men, green for the women—from one side of the pit to the other. The challenge is played in multiple rounds, and in each round, there are fewer balls than there are players. A player is eliminated if he/she exits the pit at the end of a round without a ball. The process continues until the last player of each gender advances the last ball to the end of the pit. If a tie occurs with one gender per team winning the final round, a tiebreaker round will be held to determine which team wins the challenge and earns immunity from the Gauntlet.
 Winner: Veterans
 Screw You: Played in two-player pairs, teams have to advance each player through a pair of obstacle courses and unscrew an oversize wing nut at the end of the first two obstacles. Once each pair advances to a stairway at the third obstacle, the next pair repeats the process, and the process continues until each pair crosses the finish line. (Note: Since the Rookies were short one male player, one guy has to go through the obstacle course twice.) The first team to advance all of their players through the obstacle course wins.
 Winner: Veterans
 Roped In: Each team must designate one male player to stand on a rope swing that has 12 ropes attached to wooden poles. Each pole is spread out with a circumference of 20 feet, and six of the wooden poles have puzzle pieces in various shapes on the sides, while the other six poles have slots matching each puzzle piece. Each team must pull and swing the ropes that will guide their designated male player to a pole, and retrieve the wooden puzzle piece that he chooses to the pole with the matching slot. The first team to match all pieces in the proper slots wins.
 Winner: Veterans
 Wring Out: A pair of clothes lines are hanging on a beach with designated colored buckets and white clothing. Teams must designate which players will put on the clothing, run into the ocean, and soak themselves with as much water as possible, as well as which players will load the soaked clothing (after the "soakers" undress), transfer to their teammates, and wring out the water in their designated colored bucket on the other side of the clothes line. The process continues until the first team to fill up their water bucket to a fill line wins.
 Winner: Veterans
 Blind Man's Maze: Teams must advance each player one-by-one through an obstacle course that has an observation deck in the center. One player from each team is designated as the "eyes" of the team and stands atop the deck, and will try to guide their blindfolded teammates through the maze, over and under ropes, wooden logs and tires in the sand. Once each player advances to the end, he/she must ring a bell, then tag the next teammate, and the process continues until the first team to advance each player through the obstacle course wins.
 Winner: Rookies
 Push It: Teams have to build a road along an obstacle course on the beach, by using 12 wooden planks underneath two cars — one car for each team, and each team has to designate one player to steer the car, while the remainder of the team pushes the car on the wooden planks, and move the wooden planks to the front in order to push the car through the obstacle course. The first team to push their car through the course and to the finish line wins.
 Winner: Veterans
 Man Overboard: Teams have to advance on a sled, from one side of a horizontal 120-foot track to another, that is suspended 25 feet above water. A maximum of five players can sit on the sled, and each player can only compete once. The challenge is played in three heats per team, with a heat defined as making it from one end of the track to the other. When T. J. Lavin sounds the horn, players on the sled have to use a rope to pull themselves from one side of the track to the other, have one player jump 25 feet into the water at the end of the track, and repeating the process until the last player on the sled reaches the end of a track, and jumps into the water, which will stop the team time. The team with the fastest average time per heat wins. (Note: Melinda did not participate in this challenge, after she suffered a mild concussion in the previous challenge, "Push It.")
 Winner: Veterans
 Assembly Required: Each team will disassemble a 20-foot tall, 900-square foot pyramid, which is a replica of El Castillo, Chichen Itza, and transport the pieces to another location and reassemble the pieces again on their designated loading zone. The team that completes their pyramid wins.
 Winner: Rookies
 Walk The Plank: Players from each team have to advance from one end of a narrow plank to the other that is suspended 20 feet above water, while five players from the opposing team and same gender that are sitting on a nearby platform will try to knock them off the bridge by using swinging medicine balls, two balls per player. A player trying to advance on the plank is disqualified if he/she touches the swinging medicine ball with their hands. The challenge is played in separate male and female heats — two per gender, and the team that advances the most players from one end of the plank to the other wins.
 Winner: Veterans
 Pole Push: A pole is situated in the middle of a large circle in the sand, and players from each team must grab onto the pole on both sides, and push the opposing team out of the circle until each player from the opposing team is out of the circle. The challenge is played in separate male and female heats, and if a tie occurs with each team winning one heat, a tiebreaker would be held with one girl per team trying to push each other out of the circle. The team that pushes their opponent out of the circle twice wins.
 Winner: Veterans
 I Dig You: A series of half-buried coffins are spread out on the beach — two for each team, and all but one player from each team will be buried in their designated coffins, two feet deep in the sand, while each team will designate one player to dig his/her teammates out of their coffins. Next to each coffin, there is a sign containing three true/false questions about each player, and if that player solves each question correctly, he/she can rescue his/her teammate out of the coffin, however, if one answer is incorrect, the player designated as the digger has to move on the next coffin. The first team to rescue all of their teammates out of their coffins wins.
 Winner: Veterans
 Over The Edge: A pair of planks are hanging from the top of a 25-story building. A 10-foot cable ladder, with a flag at the bottom, is attached to the end of each plank. When T. J. Lavin sounds the horn, players from each team have to make their way onto the planks and down the ladder, retrieve their team flag, then make their way back up the ladder and touch a truss at the start of the plank, which will stop a team time. If a player falls off the ladder or refuses to compete (due to a fear of heights), a 15-minute penalty will be added to the slowest time. The team with the fastest average time wins.
 Winner: Rookies
 Mexican Blanket: Players from each team are wrapped up in Mexican blankets on opposite sides of a course on the beach. The goal is for each team is for each player to roll toward the opponent's side of the course, by passing each other and blocking opposing players from advancing. The team that advances all of their players across the finish line at the opposite side of the course wins.
 Winner: Veterans
 Chill Out: Players from each team have to submerge themselves in a large tub of ice water, one player at a time, for at least five seconds. The game is played in multiple rounds — five minutes per round, and a player is eliminated if he/she decides that the freezing temperatures become too much for him/her to handle, or requires the assistance of a medic. A team time is stopped once each player has exited the ice tub. The team that can withstand the freezing ice water for the longest time wins, with the women from the winning team automatically in the final challenge.
 Winner: Rookies
 Well-Balanced: Each team has to balance on two 25-foot circular platforms — one platform for each team — by dispersing the weight of each player. Once each team has perfectly leveled their platform, they will have 10 seconds to keep their platform level, with the first team to accomplish this twice not only winning the challenge, but also with the men from the winning team automatically competing in the final challenge.
 Winner: Rookies

Gauntlet games
In the Gauntlet, the game played is determined by spinning a wheel. The wheel contains six sections, one for each Gauntlet game and one for 'spin again'. The game that was played in the previous Gauntlet is replaced by another 'spin again' section, and therefore, no Gauntlet game can be played twice in a row.

Force Field: The two competitors are joined by a rope that goes over the top of them by a pulley system. For one player to move forward he has to drag the other backwards. Each competitor starts at their line and at the start of the Gauntlet they both race to cross their opponents line. First one to do this wins.
Played twice: Nehemiah vs. Alex, Frank vs. Tyler
Ram It Home: The two competitors start with a wall at their back and a sled that hangs on an overhead track in front of them. They must then use the sled to push each other. The first player to push their opponent all the way back into their own wall wins the Gauntlet.
Played twice: Jillian vs. Angel, Nehemiah vs. Ryan
Ball Brawl: The two competitors have to return footballs, which are aligned in a longitudinal pattern, back the starting point. Beginning with the nearest ball, the competitors both race at the same time to get the ball, and they are allowed to tackle the person and strip the ball. The five balls are each contested separately (not continuously). The first three balls, black, are worth 1 point. The last two balls are white, and worth two points each. The first person to get four points wins.
Played 6 times: Jillian vs. Brooke, Jillian vs. Janelle, Coral vs. Beth, Tori vs. Melinda, Evelyn vs. Casey, Adam vs. Danny
Sliders: The two competitors each have to solve a slide puzzle at the same time. They are 16 space puzzle boards and each of them has the same design, and are given a picture of what the final design should look like. One of them is blue, the other red. Their teammates (and the opposing team) are allowed to watch and help them solve it.
Played 4 times: Evan vs. Johnny, Frank vs. Zach, Ryan vs. Derek, Paula vs. Katie
Ankle Breaker: Ankle Breaker is a variation of Tug Of War with both participants tied together by one ankle. They have to pull their opponent through the sand until they reach a rope which will help them reach the finish line. This is very similar to Reverse Tug of War used in the Gauntlet 2.
Played once: MJ vs. Frank

Army Strong final challenge
Each team starts out on a yacht half a mile off the Mexican Riviera, with one key handed to them by T. J. Levin. Every player has to jump off the yacht, and swim to the shore, in which the remainder of the challenge will be a footrace, containing checkpoints that are reminiscent of the aforementioned challenge games. T. J. Lavin explains to each team that all team members must cross the finish line to win the Army Strong Final Challenge. Each checkpoint contains a key that a team will need in order to obtain instructions for further checkpoints, and after the first checkpoint, teammates must be connected together by chains for the remainder of the race unless they are instructed otherwise. The first checkpoint is a combination of the "Chill Out" and "Assembly Required" games, in which players from each team must jump into a large ice tub in order to retrieve 20 pieces of a puzzle that are located at the bottom of the ice tub. Once a team has solved their puzzle, they can obtain another key, and then race to the next checkpoint, which is based on the "Screw You" challenge. Each team has to unscrew an oversize wing nut until it has been removed off a track, which contains the key to the next checkpoint, which is based on the "Sliders" elimination game. Note: Prior to this checkpoint, Eric collapsed and needed medical assistance, and the Veterans team became disqualified when he was removed from the final challenge. The final two checkpoints are based on the "Man Overboard" and "I Dig You" games. At the "I Dig You" checkpoint, each team must dig deep through the sand in order to retrieve a treasure chest that contains a flag. After digging through the sand, the Veterans raise their flag ahead of the Rookies, however T. J. Lavin does not blow horn, because the Veterans had already been disqualified. Once the Rookies raise their team flag, they are declared the winning team.
 Real World/Road Rules Challenge: The Gauntlet III Winner: Rookies (win $300,000 — $50,000 for each player)

Game summary

Elimination chart

Gauntlet progress

Teams
 The contestant is on the Rookies team
 The contestant is on the Veterans team
Competition
 The contestant's team won the final challenge by default
 The contestant's team finished first in the final challenge, but was disqualified due to a missing team member
 The contestant's team won the mission
 The contestant's team won the first mission and received the good house
 The contestant's team lost the first mission and received the bad house
 The contestant was protected from the Gauntlet by the winning team
 The contestant won the Gauntlet
 The contestant lost the Gauntlet and was eliminated
 The contestant withdrew from the competition
 The contestant was removed from the competition due to illness

Partners

Episodes

Reunion special
Trim the Fat: The Gauntlet III Reunion was hosted by Lyndsey Rodrigues, filmed in New York, and premiered March 26, 2008. The most common topics of discussion are the various romances, backstabbing and deceit amongst the cast members. Frank and Jillian are still a couple and living together. Tori and Brad are together, though living apart. Johanna and Wes broke up. Paula and Derek decided to remain friends and Casey and Johnny are not a couple, nor are Evelyn and Brooke, and Evelyn is told that Brooke is dating her ex-girlfriend. CT and Diem are not present, Katie reveals they have broken up. Coral heavily criticized Evelyn for betraying the women, Evelyn says she didn't care if the men threw challenges to get rid of them. Both Rachel and Tori say that their conflicts with Frank were in the past, and Evan and Kenny praised Frank for digging for hours to retrieve the winning chest of money in the final challenge, saying Frank should have gotten an extra cut of the final prize. Brad stated they wanted Beth out because she might have thrown missions. Johanna comments about Melinda's false belief that she was betrayed over the Gauntlet deliberations. Eric's failure in the final challenge is discussed, and it is revealed that only Brad, Coral, and Katie are still friends with him. Footage from the upcoming The Real World: Hollywood season is shown.

Music from The Gauntlet III

Challenge 15: Army Strong
 "15 Minutes" - Wired All Wrong (Theme song)
 "Ten Thousand Strong" - Iced Earth
 "Life is Beautiful" - SIXX:A.M.
 "Freakum Dress" - Beyoncé Knowles
 "Running Up That Hill" - Placebo
 "Take This to Heart" - Mayday Parade
 "Wow, I Can Get Sexual Too" - Say Anything
 "When I Get Home, You're So Dead" - Mayday Parade
 "Shut Up and Drive" - Rihanna
 "Would You Love a Monsterman?" - Lordi
 "Going Through Changes" - Army of Me
 "Scream Out Loud" - Baltimore
 "Supermassive Black Hole" - Muse
 "Lose It" - Cartel (Last song played, as Vets raise their flag, but do not win the competition)
 "Maniac (R.O.D.)" - Four Year Strong
Source for this section:

Notes

References

External links
 
 Cast information and other show data at the Internet Movie Database

Gauntlet III
Television shows set in Mexico
2008 American television seasons
Television shows filmed in Mexico